The GAZ-69 is a four-wheel drive off-road vehicle produced by GAZ (ГАЗ, or Gorkovsky Avtomobilnyi Zavod, Gorky Automobile Factory) between 1953 and 1956 and then by UAZ, in 1956–1972, though all of these light truck class vehicles were known as GAZ-69s. It was also produced in Romania until 1975.

Development and production
The GAZ-69 was created by the team of chief designer Grigoriy Vasserman as a replacement for the GAZ-67B that would have lower fuel consumption than its predecessor and use the same   inline four and three-speed transmission as the GAZ-M20 Pobeda. The development process started in 1946 and the first prototypes known under the name "Truzhenik" (Toiler) were built in 1947. After extensive on-road testing, the new off-road vehicle went into production on August 25, 1953. Over 600,000 GAZ-69s had been built by the end of production in the USSR in 1972. a copy of the GAZ-69 with some modifications was produced by ARO in Romania until 1975, first as the IMS-57, its main difference was that it used the GAZ-A type I4 engine (obtained by importing old Soviet tooling, as the original GAZ-69 engine was seen as uneconomical), then heavily redisigned as the IMS M59, and later modernized as the ARO M461. GAZ-69s were standard military jeeps of the Eastern Bloc and client states, except Romania that used mainly the locally built ARO models.

Design
The standard GAZ-69 was able to reach , but more powerful versions, with 2400 cc (derived from the basic 2100 cc) 65 h.p. engines and the same three-speed gearbox, could reach . They were known as the GAZ-69M, or GAZ-69AM for the four-door version.

It featured two fuel tanks, one of  under the floor, one of  beneath the passenger's seat. All civilian models also had to meet Army requirements, in case of wartime requisitioning. (This is also why a hardtop version was not available until 1993) The basic variant GAZ-69 has a pair of doors and usually has standard canvas top and upper sides; there are two seats in front and two folding benches for three passengers each on sides. The further variant GAZ-69A (UAZ-69A) has four doors, folding canvas top and two rows of seats.

It was used as the basis for the rear-wheel drive van GAZ-19 that was built in 1955 but didn't pass the prototype stage. The off-road van and light truck UAZ-450 and the newer UAZ-469 also traced their origins to the GAZ-69.

Military use
The GAZ-69 had been the basic light off-road vehicle of the Soviet Army, replacing GAZ-67s and Willys Jeeps, before the army adopted the UAZ-469. It was also used as the basis for the 2P26 tank destroyer, as well as for the GAZ-46 MAV, a light 4x4 amphibious vehicle inspired by the Ford GPA 'Seep'.

Users

 (around 4400 units ordered in total; first batch 4000 units ordered by government, second batch 400 units ordered by Indonesian Air Force)

Many civilian use yellow coloured ones were imported in to Nepal and we're successfully used in the mountain roads.

In Popular Culture 
In the film Indiana Jones and the Kingdom of the Crystal Skull a GAZ-69 appears in one of the chases of the film involving Spalko and the main characters. Also, two GAZ-46s appear in that scene.

Gallery

See also
Einheits-PKW der Wehrmacht
Stoewer R200 light off-road car

References

External links 

 GAZ-69 – Everything you want to know about the GAZ-69
 GAZ-69 on sale at the Mortar Investments website
 GAZ-69 at the Soviet Armor website

All-wheel-drive vehicles
Off-road vehicles
GAZ Group trucks
Military vehicles of the Soviet Union
Military light utility vehicles
Military trucks of the Soviet Union
Military vehicles introduced in the 1950s